Tim Bergmann (born 2 March 1972) is a German actor. He appeared in more than ninety films since 1993.

Filmography

References

External links 

1972 births
Living people
Actors from Düsseldorf
German male film actors